Lankantien Lamboni (born 31 May 1990 in Dapaong, Togo) is a Togolese track and field athlete, specializing in the 400 metres hurdles. He competed at the 2012 Summer Olympics getting disqualified in the heats. He ran at the Kazan Universiade Games in the 400 metres hurdles and 110 m hurdles events.

International competitions

Personal bests
Outdoor
110 metres hurdles – 15.42 (Kazan 2013)
400 metres hurdles – 53.99 (Porto Novo 2012)

References

1990 births
Living people
People from Savanes Region, Togo
Togolese male hurdlers
Athletes (track and field) at the 2012 Summer Olympics
Olympic athletes of Togo
Competitors at the 2013 Summer Universiade
21st-century Togolese people